William Brunton Murray (15 December 1881 – 1929) was a Scottish professional footballer who played as a winger for Sunderland.

References

1881 births
1929 deaths
People from Forres
Scottish footballers
Association football wingers
Forres Mechanics F.C. players
Sunderland A.F.C. players
Northampton Town F.C. players
Tottenham Hotspur F.C. players
Leeds City F.C. players
English Football League players
Sportspeople from Moray
Inverness Thistle F.C. players